Golden Valley may refer to:

Places

Australia
 Golden Valley, Tasmania

United Kingdom
 Golden Valley, Derbyshire, England
 Golden Valley (Herefordshire), the valley of the River Dore, England
 Golden Valley (Stroud), the valley of the River Frome, England

United States
 Golden Valley, Arizona
 Golden Valley, Minnesota
 Golden Valley, Nevada
 Golden Valley, North Dakota
 Golden Valley County, Montana
 Golden Valley County, North Dakota
 Golden Valley Township, Roseau County, Minnesota

Zimbabwe
 Golden Valley, Zimbabwe

Railways
 Golden Valley line, a railway line in Wiltshire and Gloucestershire, England
 Golden Valley Light Railway, in Derbyshire, England
 Golden Valley Railway, in Hertfordshire, England

Other uses 
 Golden Valley (children's play), by Dorothy Hewett, 1981

See also
 
 Golden Valley High School (disambiguation)